Johann Baptist Bohadsch (14 June 1724 – 16 October 1768) was a German professor of botany and pharmacology and a naturalist.

Biography
Johann was born in 1724 in Schinkau. His father was manager of the estates of Count Wenzel von Zwrtby. Johann was educated at a Jesuit seminary where he learned Latin and philosophy. He then studied medicine at the "Carolina Medicin".

Between 1746 and 1750, he made trips to Padua, Montpellier, Paris and several German universities and after his return published a dissertation on the uses of electricity in medicine. In 1753 he was made associate professor of natural philosophy in Prague and began to collect materials for a work on the natural history of Bohemia. Interrupted by the war and riots, he travelled to Italy from  1757 to 1759, where he collected and described a number of new species of marine invertebrates. On his return he was appointed professor of botany and pharmacology and in 1762 elected a fellow of the Royal Society. On a natural history trip to Bohemia he contracted a severe chill. He died on 16 October 1768 in Prague.

Writings
His zoological writings include De veris Sepiarum ovis (Pragae 1752)  and De quibusdam animalibus marinis (Dresdae 1761)  the latter being translated from the Latin by Leske in 1776. He also published a booklet on the medical benefits of Acacia and of woad (Isatis tinctoria). Another booklet describing the natural history of Gmunden has remained in manuscript form.

References

 Artikel „Bohadsch, Johann Baptist“ von Victor Carus in: Allgemeine Deutsche Biographie, herausgegeben von der Historischen Kommission bei der Bayerischen Akademie der Wissenschaften, Band 3 (1876), S. 59, Digitale Volltext-Ausgabe in Wikisource, URL: http://de.wikisource.org/w/index.php?title=ADB:Bohadsch,_Johann_Baptist&oldid=1127178

1724 births
1768 deaths
Scientists from Prague
18th-century German zoologists
18th-century German botanists
18th-century German physicians
18th-century Bohemian physicians
Fellows of the Royal Society
People from Plzeň-South District